Grease 2 is a 1982 American musical romantic comedy film and the sequel to the 1978 film Grease, adapted from the 1971 musical of the same name by Jim Jacobs and Warren Casey. Originally titled More Grease, the film was produced by Allan Carr and Robert Stigwood, and directed and choreographed by Patricia Birch, who choreographed the original stage production and prior film. The plot returns to Rydell High School two years after the original film's graduation, with a largely new cast, led by Maxwell Caulfield and Michelle Pfeiffer in her first starring role.

The film was released in United States theaters on June 11, 1982, and grossed $15 million against a production budget of $11 million, a far cry from its predecessor's $132 million domestic box office. Despite breakout roles for Pfeiffer, Adrian Zmed, and Christopher McDonald, the film received mostly negative reviews from critics. Despite this, Grease 2 maintains a devoted fan base decades after its release.

Plot
It is 1961, two years after the events of the prior film, and the first day of school has arrived ("Alma Mater" from the original stage musical).  Principal McGee and her secretary Blanche react as  the students, including the ruffian T-Birds and Pink Ladies, arrive at high school ("Back to School Again"). The Pink Ladies are now led by Stephanie Zinone, who feels she has "outgrown" her relationship with her ex-boyfriend Johnny Nogerelli, the arrogant, chauvinistic, and rather immature leader of the motorcycle riding T-Birds.

A new arrival comes in the form of clean-cut British student Michael Carrington (a cousin of Sandy Olsson from the previous film). He is introduced to the school atmosphere by Frenchy, who agreed to help show Michael around. Frenchy has returned to Rydell to obtain her diploma so she can start her own cosmetics company. Michael eventually meets Stephanie and quickly becomes smitten with her.

At the local bowling alley, a game ("Score Tonight") turns sour from the animosity between Johnny and Stephanie. Stephanie retaliates by kissing the next man who walks in the door, who happens to be Michael. Bemused by this unexpected kiss, Michael falls in love with Stephanie. He asks her out, but learns she has a very specific vision of her ideal man ("Cool Rider"). After realizing how he can win her affection, Michael gets to work on acquiring a motorcycle. Michael begins to covertly accept payments from the T-Birds to write their term papers and uses the cash to buy a motorcycle. Substitute teacher Mr. Stuart leads a rousing biology lesson ("Reproduction").

A rival gang called the Cycle Lords (including members of the defunct Scorpions) led by Leo Balmudo, surprise the T-Birds at the bowling alley. Before the fight starts, a lone mysterious biker appears (actually Michael in disguise), defeats the enemy gang, and disappears into the night ("Who's That Guy?"). Stephanie is fascinated with the stranger. Meanwhile, T-Bird Louis attempts to trick his sweetheart, Pink Lady Sharon, into losing her virginity to him by taking her to a fallout shelter and faking a nuclear attack ("Let's Do It for Our Country").

The next evening while working at a gas station/garage, Stephanie is surprised again by the Cool Rider, and they enjoy a romantic twilight motorcycle ride, which includes a kiss. Just as Michael is about to reveal his identity, they are interrupted by the arrival of the T-Birds and Pink Ladies. Before Michael departs, he tells Stephanie that he will see her at the school talent show. Johnny, enraged by Stephanie's new romance, threatens to fight the Cool Rider if he sees him with her again. The Pink Ladies walk away haughtily, but this has little effect on the T-Birds' self-confidence ("Prowlin'").

At school, Stephanie's poor grades in English lead her to accept Michael's offer of help. Johnny, upon seeing them together in a discussion, demands that Stephanie quit the Pink Ladies to preserve his honor. Although still enchanted by the mysterious Cool Rider, interactions with Michael reveal that she has become romantically interested in him as well. Michael ponders over the continuing charade he puts on for Stephanie ("Charades").

At the talent show, Stephanie and the Cool Rider meet up but are abruptly ambushed by the T-Birds who pursue Michael on their respective motorcycles, with Stephanie, Sharon, Paulette, and Rhonda following in a car. They chase him to a construction site which conceals a deadly drop, and the biker's absence suggests that he has perished below, leaving Stephanie heartbroken and inconsolable. Johnny and his T-Birds remove the competing Preptones – preppie boys – by tying them to a shower pole in the boys' locker room and drenching them. During the Pink Ladies' performance in the talent show ("Girl for All Seasons"), Stephanie enters a dreamlike fantasy world where she is reunited with her mystery biker ("(Love Will) Turn Back the Hands of Time"). She is named winner of the contest and crowned the queen of the upcoming graduation luau, with Johnny hailed as king for his performance of "Prowlin'" with his fellow T-Birds.

The school year ends with the luau ("Rock-a-Hula Luau (Summer Is Coming)"), during which the Cycle Lords appear and begin to disrupt the celebration. The Cool Rider reappears, defeats the Cycle Lords again, and reveals himself to be Michael. Initially shocked, Johnny gives him a T-Birds jacket, officially welcoming him into the gang, and Stephanie is delighted that she can now be with him. Michael and Stephanie share a passionate kiss, and he whispers that he loves her. All the couples pair off happily as the graduating class sings ("We'll Be Together"). The credits start rolling in yearbook-style, as in the original film ("Back to School Again").

Cast

Principal cast 

Leads
 Maxwell Caulfield as Michael Carrington, an English exchange student and Sandy Olsson's cousin.
 Michelle Pfeiffer as Stephanie Zinone, the leader of the Pink Ladies.

The T-Birds
 Adrian Zmed as Johnny Nogerelli, the leader of The T-Birds
 Christopher McDonald as Goose McKenzie
 Peter Frechette as Louis DiMucci
 Leif Green as Davey Jaworski

The Pink Ladies
 Maureen Teefy as Sharon Cooper
 Lorna Luft as Paulette Rebchuck
 Alison Price as Rhonda Ritter
 Pamela Segall as Dolores Rebchuck

Reprising roles from Grease 
 Didi Conn as Frenchy
 Eve Arden as Principal McGee (Arden's final theatrical role)
 Sid Caesar as Coach Vince Calhoun
 Dody Goodman as Secretary Blanche Hodel
 Eddie Deezen as Eugene Felsnick
 Dennis C. Stewart as Leo Balmudo (Craterface), leader of the Cycle Lords (appeared as the gang leader of the Scorpions in the previous film)
 Dick Patterson as Mr. Spears (appeared as Mr. Rudie in the previous film)

Supporting cast
 Tab Hunter as Mr. Stuart
 Connie Stevens as Miss Yvette Mason
 Jean and Liz Sagal as the Sorority / Cheerleader Twins
 Matt Lattanzi as Brad, one of the Prep-Tones
 Donna King as Girl Greaser (lead dancer)
 Lucinda Dickey as Girl Greaser
 Ivy Austin as Girl Greaser 'Francine'
 Andy Tennant as Boy Greaser 'Artie' (Arnold in Grease)
 Bernard Hiller as Boy Greaser
 Tom Villard as Boy Greaser 'Willie' (performs "Cry" at the talent show)
 Vernon Scott as Henry Dickey, one of the Prep-Tones
 Tom Willett as bowling alley manager (uncredited)
 Janet Jones as the girl who missed her last two periods (uncredited)
 William N. Clark as Cycle Salvage Yard Manager (uncredited) – also was a cameraman
 Aurelio Padrón as Boy Greaser
 John Robert Garrett as Boy Greaser (Bubba in Grease)
 Helena Andreyko as Girl Greaser (Trix in Grease)
 Dennis Daniels as Boy Greaser (Bart in Grease)
 Vicki Hunter as Girl Greaser
 Sandra Gray as Girl Greaser (Big G. in Grease)
 John Allee as student with basketball (Calhoun: "We'll put high-heels on your sneakers and we'll make you a center!")
 Michael David Eilert as Boy Greaser (uncredited)

Production

Development
Grease co-producer Allan Carr had a deal with Paramount Pictures to be paid $5 million to produce a sequel, with production beginning within three years of the original film. Carr decided to hire Patricia Birch as director for the sequel, as she had previously served as the choreographer for the stage and film versions of Grease. Birch was initially hesitant to accept after learning that neither composers Jim Jacobs and Warren Casey nor John Travolta and Olivia Newton-John would be involved in the film. Bronte Woodard, the writer who adapted the original stage material for the original film, had died in 1980, and Canadian comic Ken Finkleman (who was also writing and directing Airplane II at the same time) was tasked with penning a new script mostly from scratch.  The total budget for the production was $11.2 million, almost double the budget of the original.

Grease 2 was intended to be the second film (and first sequel) in a proposed Grease franchise of four films and a television series. (The third and fourth films were to take place in the 1960s and during the counterculture era.) However, the projects were scrapped due to the underwhelming box office performance of Grease 2. Maxwell Caulfield was unhappy with the film's "drab" title, and unsuccessfully lobbied to change it to Son of Grease.

Casting
Birch proposed an idea to feature Travolta and Newton-John reprising their characters as a now married couple running a gas station near the end of the film, with Travolta to sing a new number "Gas Pump Jockey;" this did not come to fruition. Paramount tried to get Jeff Conaway and Stockard Channing from the first film to do cameos but this did not happen (Channing, by then 37 years old, had left Hollywood for a time in the early 1980s to focus on her stage career). Early plans for Grease 2 had Conaway and Channing's characters, Kenickie and Rizzo, as main characters while they attended summer school.

Timothy Hutton was announced as the male lead, but Maxwell Caulfield was cast after impressing producers off-Broadway in Entertaining Mister Sloane. Caulfield had already made his Broadway debut with roles in The Elephant Man and Entertaining Mr. Sloane. Having seen his performances, Allan Carr offered Caulfield the role of Michael over thousands of applicants. Unlike co-star Pfeiffer, Caulfield's career following Grease 2 was damaged by the film's failure. He has been quoted as saying: "Before Grease 2 came out, I was being hailed as the next Richard Gere or John Travolta. However, when Grease 2 flopped, nobody would touch me. It felt like a bucket of cold water had been thrown in my face. It took me 10 years to get over Grease 2."

With only a few television roles and small film appearances, Michelle Pfeiffer, then aged 23, was a relatively unknown actress when she attended the casting call audition for the role of Stephanie. Other actresses considered for the part included Lisa Hartman, Kristy McNichol, Andrea McArdle, and singer Pat Benatar. Pfeiffer was a wild card choice, but according to Birch, she won the part because she "has a quirky quality you don't expect." She later commented on being cast:

That was really weird for me. I'd been taking singing lessons and I had taken dance, because I loved to dance, but I had never considered myself a professional at all. I went on this audition as a fluke, and somehow, through the process of going back and dancing, and then going back and singing, I ended up getting the part. I went crazy with that movie. I came to New York and the paparazzi were waiting at the hotel. I know the producers put them up to it. I am basically very private, and I'm really nervous about doing publicity. Every time I set up an interview, I say, "That's it, this is my last one. I'll do this because I committed to doing it, but I'm never doing another one." It was insane.

Lorna Luft was the last star cast. The part played by Connie Stevens was originally meant for Annette Funicello but she was unable to appear because her schedule as Skippy peanut butter spokeswoman did not allow her time to film the scene.

Adrian Zmed had previously played the role of Danny Zuko in the stage version of Grease, a role he would later reprise in the 1990s.

Filming
Scenes at Rydell High School were filmed at Excelsior High School, a recently closed high school in Norwalk, California. Filming took place throughout a 58-day shooting schedule during the autumn of 1981. According to director Birch, the script was still incomplete when filming commenced. Sequences that were filmed but cut during post-production include scenes in which Frenchy helps Michael become a motorcycle rider, and a sequence at the end of the film showing Michael and Stephanie flying off into the sky on a motorcycle.

In the film, after Stephanie wins the contest, it goes on to show the stakeout in the final scene. Originally, there were a few minutes dedicated to a scene in which Michael (believed to be dead in his alter ego, by Stephanie) comes out on stage as Stephanie is exiting the stage, unbeknownst to her that he is the cool rider and he is alive. He attempts to ask her what's wrong and she storms past him and runs off crying, then it cuts to the stakeout. There was a scene within the "Who's that Guy?" number in which Goose accidentally smashes Rhonda's nose at the Bowl-A-Rama door. None of these scenes have been shown since the film's release.

Music

 "Back to School Again" – Cast and The Four Tops (verses by the Pink Ladies are absent from the soundtrack)
 "Score Tonight" – T-Birds, Pink Ladies, Cast
 "Brad" – Noreen and Doreen
 "Cool Rider" – Stephanie
 "Reproduction" – Mr. Stuart and Students
 "Who's That Guy?" – Michael, T-Birds, Pink Ladies, Cycle Lords, and Cast
 "Do It for Our Country" – Louis and Sharon (Sharon's part is absent from the soundtrack)
 "Prowlin'" – Johnny and T-Birds
 "Charades" – Michael
 "Girl for All Seasons" – Sharon, Paulette, Rhonda, and Stephanie
 "(Love Will) Turn Back the Hands of Time" – Stephanie and Michael
 "Rock-a-Hula Luau (Summer Is Coming)" – Cast
 "We'll Be Together" – Michael, Stephanie, Johnny, Paulette, and Cast

Featured as background music at Rydell Sport Field:
 "Moon River" (The Spirit of Troy- University of Southern California Marching Band)

Featured as background music at the bowling alley:
 "Our Day Will Come" – Ruby & The Romantics (Grease 2 takes place in 1961–62 and "Our Day Will Come" did not come out until 1963)
 "Rebel Walk" – Duane Eddy (this was the B-side of his biggest hit "Because They're Young")

Featured at the beginning:
 "Alma Mater" – Instrumental (this song was played at the beginning when Principal McGee and Blanche put up the 1961 Rydell flag)

Release

Box office
The sequel took in just over $15 million after coming at fifth on opening weekend behind E.T.: The Extra-Terrestrial, Star Trek II: The Wrath of Khan, Rocky III, and Poltergeist.

Critical response
, on Rotten Tomatoes, the film had an approval rating of 35% based on 43 reviews, with an average rating of 4.3/10. The site's consensus read: "Grease 2 is undeniably stocked with solid songs and well-choreographed dance sequences, but there's no getting around the fact that it's a blatant retread of its far more entertaining predecessor." , on Metacritic it had a score of 52% based on reviews from 11 critics, indicating "mixed or average reviews".

Janet Maslin of The New York Times condemned the film as "dizzy and slight, with an even more negligible plot than its predecessor had. This time the story can't even masquerade as an excuse for stringing the songs together. Songs? What songs? The numbers in Grease 2 are so hopelessly insubstantial that the cast is forced to burst into melody about pastimes like bowling."

Variety commended the staging of the musical numbers, writing that Patricia Birch has come up with some unusual settings (a bowling alley, a bomb shelter) for some of the scenes, and employs some sharp montage to give most of the songs and dances a fair amount of punch."

Roger Ebert of the Chicago Sun-Times gave the film 2 stars out of 4, saying: "This movie just recycles Grease, without the stars, without the energy, without the freshness and without the grease."

Pfeiffer received positive notices for her first major role. The New York Times review cited her performance as the "one improvement" on the original film: "Miss Pfeiffer is as gorgeous as any cover girl, and she has a sullen quality that's more fitting to a Grease character than Miss Newton-John's sunniness was." Variety wrote that she was "all anyone could ask for in the looks department, and she fills Olivia Newton-John's shoes and tight pants very well." Pfeiffer told the Los Angeles Times three years later:

Barry Diller of Paramount said that the film "on no level is as good as the first. The quality isn't there."

Jim Jacobs described it at the time as "awful ... the pits." In an interview 27 years later, Jacobs noted that Grease 2 "still brings a brief frown to his face."

During his appearance on Rotten Tomatoes to promote the film Tick, Tick... Boom!, British actor Andrew Garfield cited the film as one of his five favorite musicals, calling it "great".

Accolades
Pfeiffer was nominated for a 1983 Young Artist Award in the category of Best Young Motion Picture Actress.

The film was nominated for a Stinkers Bad Movie Awards for Worst Picture. Later on, the Stinkers would unveil their picks for the 100 worst films of the 20th century with their "100 Years, 100 Stinkers" list. Grease 2 ranked in the listed bottom 20 at #13.

The film was given a special screening at the 2021 online TCM Festival.

Remakes
The film's screenplay was adapted in the Kannada (South India) feature film Premaloka, starring Ravichandran and Juhi Chawla, released in 1987, which went on to become a blockbuster.

Plans for a third film
In 2003, Olivia Newton-John confirmed that a second sequel was being developed. "They're writing it, and we'll see what happens. If the script looks good, I'll do it. But I haven't seen the script, and it has to be cleverly done." Newton-John died in 2022 before any such script was completed.

In 2008, it was reported that Paramount was planning a new sequel to Grease that would debut straight to DVD. However, the project never came to fruition.

In 2019, it was announced that a prequel to the original film entitled Summer Lovin''' with John August attached to write the screenplay was in the works at Paramount.

Stage musical
The film was later adapted into a musical, Cool Rider'', with the script re-written and modified for the stage.

References

Bibliography

External links

 
 

1982 films
1982 directorial debut films
1982 romantic comedy films
1980s high school films
1980s musical comedy films
1980s romantic musical films
1980s teen comedy films
1980s teen romance films
American high school films
American musical comedy films
American rock musicals
American romantic comedy films
American romantic musical films
American sequel films
American teen comedy films
American teen musical films
American teen romance films
1980s English-language films
Films produced by Allan Carr
Films produced by Robert Stigwood
Films set in 1961
Films set in 1962
Films set in California
Films shot in Los Angeles County, California
Films with screenplays by Ken Finkleman
Grease (musical)
Paramount Pictures films
1980s American films
1980s dance films